Bongo is one of the constituencies represented in the Parliament of Ghana. It elects one Member of Parliament (MP) by the first past the post system of election. Bongo is located in the Bongo district  of the Upper East Region of Ghana.

Boundaries
The seat is located within the Bongo District in the Upper East Region of Ghana.

Members of Parliament

Elections

See also
List of Ghana Parliament constituencies

References 

Parliamentary constituencies in the Upper East Region